Whitfieldia is a genus of plants in the family Acanthaceae with about 14 species in tropical Africa. 
 Whitfieldia arnoldiana De Wild. & T.Durand
 Whitfieldia brazzae (Baill.) C.B.Clarke
 Whitfieldia colorata C.B.Clarke ex Stapf
 Whitfieldia elongata (P.Beauv.) De Wild. & T.Durand
 Whitfieldia lateritia Hook.
 Whitfieldia latiflos C.B.Clarke
 Whitfieldia laurentii (Lindau) C.B.Clarke
 Whitfieldia letestui Benoist
 Whitfieldia liebrechtsiana De Wild. & T.Durand
 Whitfieldia orientalis Vollesen
 Whitfieldia preussii (Lindau) C.B.Clarke
 Whitfieldia purpurata (Benoist) Heine
 Whitfieldia rutilans Heine
 Whitfieldia stuhlmannii (Lindau) C.B.Clarke
 Whitfieldia thollonii (Baill.) Benoist

References

Acanthaceae
Acanthaceae genera
Taxonomy articles created by Polbot